John Allen Nelson is an American actor and screenwriter. He is best known for his roles on television as Warren Lockridge on Santa Barbara, John D. Cort on Baywatch, Walt Cummings in 24 and Silas Bunch in Crazy Ex-Girlfriend. He is also known for starring in the cult classic science fiction comedy horror  film Killer Klowns from Outer Space.

Career
Nelson portrayed original series character Warren Lockridge on the American soap opera Santa Barbara from August 1, 1984, to April 29, 1986. He starred as the title character in the low-budget 1987 comedy-fantasy Hunk where a nerd was transformed into a golden-tanned, muscular hunk after "leasing" his soul to the Devil.

Nelson co-starred with Grant Cramer, Suzanne Snyder, Royal Dano and John Vernon in the 1988 cult/sci-fi epic Killer Klowns from Outer Space.

Nelson co-starred (and later recurred) in the early seasons of the series Baywatch as "John D. Cort," a lifeguard who is ultimately forced to retire because of retinitis pigmentosa. Later, Nelson co-starred with fellow Baywatch alum Gena Lee Nolin in the syndicated Sheena, Queen of the Jungle.

Nelson also co-wrote the screenplay for the martial arts-yarn Best of the Best 2, which was released in 1993, as well as American Yakuza starring Viggo Mortensen.  The following year, in 1994, Nelson co-wrote and co-starred in the movie Criminal Passion which featured Joan Severance and Anthony Denison.

Nelson's most critically acclaimed television success was in the role of Walt Cummings in 24, followed by the role of Senator Jeffrey Collins in the 2006 Fox drama Vanished.

Nelson also appeared as Paul, Monica Geller's boyfriend (also known as "The Wine Guy") in the first episode of Friends.

Personal life

Nelson married Åse Samuelsson in 1988. They separated in 2003 and divorced in 2005. His two children from the  marriage, son Axel (born 1990) and daughter Linnea (born 1994), live with their mother in Sweden. He married actress Justine Eyre in a four-day fairytale wedding at Château de Farcheville outside Paris, France in September 2007 and they have a son, Luca Nelson, born in Los Angeles in August 2009. They later moved to Ottawa, Ontario, Canada, in the mid 2010s.

Filmography

Film

Television

References

External links 

American male television actors
Living people
American male soap opera actors
American male film actors
American television writers
American male television writers
Place of birth missing (living people)
Year of birth missing (living people)